Clark Lannerdahl Brundin (born 21 March 1931  in Los Angeles County, California) was a Vice-Chancellor of the University of Warwick, President of Templeton College, and an Oxford councillor.

He was born in California and moved to the Engineering Department of the University of Oxford in 1957. He was a teacher and researcher (in high altitude aerodynamics) at Oxford, becoming a Fellow and Tutor in Jesus College. From 1985-1992, he was Vice Chancellor of the University of Warwick, returning to Oxford to become the founding director of the Saïd Business School, established in 1992, and was also President of Templeton College.

Brundin was a school governor and a governor of Oxford Polytechnic (now Oxford Brookes University), as well as a non-executive director of Blackwell Science.

Brundin was a Liberal Democrat city councillor since 2004 and was a member of the Audit Committee, the Finance Scrutiny Committee, the Housing Advisory Board and the Strategic Development Control Committee as well as serving on other panels.

He died at the age of 90 on 3 May 2021.

References

1931 births
Living people
Vice-Chancellors of the University of Warwick
Fellows of Jesus College, Oxford
Presidents of Templeton College, Oxford
People associated with Oxford Brookes University
School governors
American emigrants to England
People from Los Angeles County, California